Divnogorye is a rural locality (a khutor) in Selyavinskoye Rural Settlement, Liskinsky District, Voronezh Oblast, Russia. The population was 251 as of 2010. There are 6 streets.

Geography 
Divnogorye is located 44 km west of Liski (the district's administrative centre) by road. Peski-Kharkovskiye is the nearest rural locality.

References 

Rural localities in Liskinsky District